Serine/threonine-protein phosphatase 2A 55 kDa regulatory subunit B beta isoform is an enzyme that in humans is encoded by the PPP2R2B gene.

The product of this gene belongs to the phosphatase 2regulatory subunit B family. Protein phosphatase 2 is one of the four major Ser/Thr phosphatases, and it is implicated in the negative control of cell growth and division. It consists of a common heteromeric core enzyme, which is composed of a catalytic subunit and a constant regulatory subunit, that associates with a variety of regulatory subunits. The B regulatory subunit might modulate substrate selectivity and catalytic activity. This gene encodes a beta isoform of the regulatory subunit B55 subfamily. Defects in the 5' UTR of this gene may cause a rare form of autosomal dominant spinocerebellar ataxia 12.

References

Further reading

External links
  GeneReviews/NCBI/NIH/UW entry on Spinocerebellar Ataxia Type 12